So Fierce Music is a Canadian record label and entertainment company founded by Velvet Code during the COVID-19 pandemic. The company caters to artists who have been treated as insignificant by the music industry due to their identity or background.

History 
So Fierce Music was founded in 2020 by Canadian musical artist Velvet Code. Velvet Code has over 20 years working in the music field along with working with Lady Gaga, and he created this record label / entertainment company due to his knowledge of how hard it can be for LGBTQ+ artists in the music industry. On September 25, 2020, the first musical release on the label was performed by artist Sofonda Cox.

Artists 

 Sofonda Cox
 Gisele Lullaby
 Deity Jane
 Velvet Code
 Icesis Couture
 Adriana 
 Oceane Aqua-Black
 Scarlett Bobo
 Jay Light
 Brandon Hilton
 Danny Dymond
 Elle Taylor
 Jaime Adrian
 Justin Cross
 Kali Marz
 London Shanel
 Tash Riot
 Trey Mon$y
 Kalym
 Preston Faye
 Roman
 Bashful Tendencies
 Of Eden
 Lester Jay
 Juan Lords
 Naomi Leone
 Shay Dee
 London Shanel
 Jordyn Balor
 Mona Moore
 David Rabadi

Discography 

 Sofonda Cox - Thrive (2020)
 Sofonda Cox - Thrive, Velvet Code Remix (2021)
 London Shanel - BAD BXTCH, feat. Velvet Code (2021)
 Danny Dymond - What Do You Want, feat. Velvet Code (2021)
 Jordyn Balor - Test Drive, feat. Velvet Code (2021)
 Icesis Couture - La Pusetta, feat. Velvet Code (2021)
 Deity Jane - Hypertension Honey, feat. Velvet Code (2021)
 Mona Moore - Slay, feat. Velvet Code (2021)
 Kali Marz - S.O.S. (I Want Your Love), feat. Velvet Code (2021)
 Elle Taylor - Goddess, feat. Velvet Code (2021)
 Jay Light - Damn Daddy (2021)
 Juan Lords - Your Love or My Love (2021)
 Jaime Adrian - What Were You Drinking, feat. Velvet Code (2021)
 Kalym - Perdidos (2022)
 Preston Faye - Eros, feat. Velvet Code (2022)
 Roman - Price to Pay, feat. Velvet Code (2022)
 Oceane Aqua-Black - READDIT, feat Velvet Code (2022)
 Oceane Aqua-Black - Creampie, feat Velvet Code (2022)
 Bashful Tendencies - Press Delete (2022)
 Elle Taylor - Bussy Boy, feat. Velvet Code (2022)
 Velvet Code - As Above so Below, feat. Of Eden (2022)
 Kali Marz - Say My Name, feat. Velvet Code (2022)
 Lester Jay - Make It Right, feat. Velvet Code (2022)
 Jaime Adrian - Feed My Ego, feat. Velvet Code (2022)
 Naomi Leone - Xtravaganza, feat. Velvet Code (2022)
 Shay Dee - All Eyes on Me, feat. Velvet Code (2022)
 Gisele Lullaby - Je Ne Sais Quoi, feat. Velvet Code (2022)

References

External links 

 Official website
Canadian independent record labels
Canadian hip hop record labels
Record labels established in 2020
Rock record labels
Pop record labels
Rhythm and blues record labels
Soul music record labels
Soundtrack record labels
LGBT culture in Canada
2020 establishments in Canada